Bridge to Nowhere is a nickname used to refer to various unfinished structures around the M8 motorway in the centre of Glasgow, Scotland. They were built in the 1960s as part of the Glasgow Inner Ring Road project but left incomplete for several years. One "bridge", at Charing Cross, was completed in the 1990s as an office block. The Anderston Footbridge, a pedestrian bridge south of St Patrick's church, was finally completed in 2013 as part of a walking and cycling route.

A third "Bridge to Nowhere" was created in 2008 following the demolition of a hotel a few blocks away from the M8 but its remains were finally removed in 2017.

Charing Cross Podium
 
The structure officially called the Charing Cross Podium was always intended to have a development of some sort on the top level. However, the incomplete structure looked like a bridge and was often referred to as the 'Bridge to Nowhere'.  When the western flank of the inner ring road was being prepared for tender in the mid-1960s the designer, Scott Wilson & Partners, advised Glasgow Corporation to include the development as part of the motorway construction contract. The Corporation ignored this advice, hoping that a developer would take on the project, along with its cost. The original masterplan for the area was devised by the architectural firm Richard Seifert & Partners, which entailed the construction of two large developments in the area: the Anderston Centre, and the Charing Cross Complex - part of the latter would be built on the podium structure. The Charing Cross scheme was scaled back, so the podium remained unused for over two decades, attracting notoriety at a time when the entire M8 construction project was the subject of very divided public opinion.

The podium, and the adjacent land on Bath Street, were developed in the mid-1990s by Malcolm Potier's Tanap Investments. Tay House, a salmon pink  office building, was later owned by Handelsbanken, MEPC, and now by commercial property company Regional REIT.  

Former tenants include the Royal Bank of Scotland and  the Criminal Injuries Compensation Board. It is rented to Barclays Stockbrokers, the University of Glasgow, and serviced-office company Regus.

Anderston Footbridge
 

  
As a highly visible structure, it assumed the title of 'Bridge to Nowhere' from the Charing Cross Podium after that was built on and lost its bridge-like appearance.

A proposal by charity Sustrans, under their national Connect2 programme, aimed to finish the construction, as well as connecting the bridge with a second one over the Clydeside Expressway. This should increase pedestrian and cycle access to central Glasgow on a route between Kelvingrove Park and the city centre. Sustrans won the funding in September 2011 – work to finally complete the bridge began in 2012 and was completed by July 2013.

The third bridge
Glasgow gained a third "Bridge to Nowhere" in 2008 on a street a few hundred metres to the east of the Anderston Footbridge. The former Albany Hotel was demolished leaving the pedestrian bridge, connecting it to the adjacent Anderston Centre, terminating in mid air over Bishop Lane at the end of Waterloo Street. The hotel was controversially razed in preparation for a new complex called Bothwell Plaza. The hotel development received planning permission in 2009 but remained unbuilt until 2016, when it was reimagined as an office complex called Bothwell Exchange. The remains of the bridge were removed in 2017 when construction on this scheme started.

References

External links
Sustrans Glasgow 'Connect 2' project: National Lottery funded project to complete the bridge as part of a walking and cycling route
Glasgow City Council pages about the Sustrans Connect2 project
The Herald Newspaper: Lottery bid to link up ‘bridge to nowhere’
BBC News – success of the bid for funding to complete the bridge
Images & map of the bridge to nowhere
Hidden Glasgow – Bridge to Nowhere and Connect2 project photos
Sauchiehall Street bridge: 
Anderston footbridge: 

Bridges to nowhere
Unfinished buildings and structures
Bridges in Glasgow
1960s in Glasgow
Footbridges
Motorway bridges in Scotland